The electoral district of Mackenzie was a Legislative Assembly electorate in the Australian state of Queensland. It was first created in a redistribution ahead of the 1950 state election, and existed until the 1972 state election.

Mackenzie incorporated some of the former district of Normanby.

Members for Mackenzie
The members for Mackenzie were:

Election results

See also
 Electoral districts of Queensland
 Members of the Queensland Legislative Assembly by year
 :Category:Members of the Queensland Legislative Assembly by name

References

Former electoral districts of Queensland
1950 establishments in Australia
1972 disestablishments in Australia
Constituencies established in 1950
Constituencies disestablished in 1972